Since the college's founding in 1846, Grinnell College has had thirteen presidents and seven acting presidents. The College president is responsible for all aspects of the institution's internal and external affairs, including administrative and academic decision-making.

While Iowa College, later renamed Grinnell College, did not have a president for the first years of its existence, after the Civil War, the trustees chose fellow trustee George Frederic Magoun to lead the institution as it matured. From his inauguration in 1865, Magoun served 19 years, the second-longest presidential tenure in the college's history.

The current Grinnell College president is Anne F. Harris, who replaced president Raynard S. Kington to become the 14th president of the College on July 14, 2020.

Presidents of the College 
 The Trustees of Iowa College 1846–1865
 George Frederic Magoun 1865–1884
 Samuel J. Buck (acting) 1884–1887
 George Augustus Gates 1887–1900
John Hanson Thomas Main (acting), 1900–1902
 Dan Freeman Bradley 1902–1905
John Hanson Thomas Main 1905–1931 (acting in first academic year)
 John Scholte Nollen 1931–1940
 Samuel Nowell Stevens 1940–1954
 Rupert Adam Hawk (acting), 1954–1955
 Howard Rothmann Bowen 1955–1964
 James Hartmann Stauss (acting) 1964–1965
 Glenn Leggett 1965–1975, President Emeritus of the College 1979–-2003
 A. Richard Turner 1975–1979
 George A. Drake 1979–1991, President Emeritus of the College 2005–
 Waldo S. Walker (acting) 1987
 Pamela A. Ferguson 1991–97
 Charles L. Duke (acting) 1998
 Russell K. Osgood 1998–2010
 Raynard S. Kington 2010–2020
 Anne F. Harris 2020–present

References

External links
 Office of the President, Grinnell College
 Presidents of Grinnell College
 Virtual Exhibit: Presidents of Grinnell College